Bonville is a small town located on the Mid North Coast of New South Wales, Australia, 11 kilometres south of Coffs Harbour and in the local government area of City of Coffs Harbour. It has a population of 1,891 as of 2006. The town's name supposedly derives from "Bongol Bongol/Bongil Bongil", which in Gumbaingirr, means a place where one stays a long time.

The town is known for Bonville International Golf Course. It has a Christian high school and two public primary schools. The town has now been bypassed by the Pacific Highway A railway station on the North Coast line was open between 1915 and 1974, it was subsequently demolished and no trace remains.

References

 

Towns in New South Wales
Mid North Coast
North Coast railway line, New South Wales